Steve Collier is a former offensive tackle in the National Football League.

Biography
Collier was born on April 19, 1963 in Chicago, Illinois.

Collegiate career
He played at the collegiate level at Bethune–Cookman University and the University of Illinois at Urbana-Champaign.

Professional career

Cleveland Browns
In 1985, Collier originally signed with the Cleveland Browns of the National Football League as a defensive end, but was converted to an offensive tackle in training camp. On August 21, 1985, he was cut by the Browns.

San Diego Chargers
On April 14, 1986, Collier signed with the San Diego Chargers of the National Football League, but was released on July 19, 1986.

Green Bay Packers
The Green Bay Packers signed Collier as a replacement during the 1987 players' strike and was retained after the strike. During the 1987 season he played in 10 games. The following year, he injured his knee in training camp and spent the 1988 season on injured reserve, with the exception of the final game in which he was on the roster but did not play. He has the distinction of wearing four different jersey numbers during his time with the Packers, they include numbers: 64, 70, 74, and 92.

New York Jets
On March 8, 1989, Collier would sign with the New York Jets of the National Football League after being left unprotected by the Packers following their 1988 season. The Jets released him on August 8, 1989.

See also
List of Green Bay Packers players

References

Players of American football from Chicago
Green Bay Packers players
American football offensive tackles
Bethune–Cookman Wildcats football players
Illinois Fighting Illini football players
National Football League replacement players
Living people
1963 births